Melissa Morgan (born 1 January 1985)  is an Australian swimmer who specialized in backstroke events.

Morgan qualified for the women's 200-metre backstroke at the 2004 Summer Olympics in Athens, by attaining both her personal record and an A-standard entry time of 2:12.90 from the Telstra Olympic Swimming Trials in Sydney. Morgan secured her spot for the semifinals, after finishing twelfth overall in the morning's preliminary heats, outside her personal record of 2:14.06. On the evening session, Morgan edged out her teammate Frances Adcock in the second semifinal run with a much faster time of 2:13.34, but failed to qualify for the final.

She is a member of the Burnside Swimming Club, and is coached and trained by Glen Beringen.

References

External links
Profile – Australian Olympic Team

1985 births
Living people
Olympic swimmers of Australia
Swimmers at the 2004 Summer Olympics
Australian female backstroke swimmers
Sportswomen from South Australia
Sportspeople from Adelaide
21st-century Australian women